Ancistrocladus is a genus of woody lianas in the monotypic family Ancistrocladaceae. The branches climb by twining other stems or by scrambling with hooked tips.  They are found in the tropics of the Old World.

Classification
The APG II system, of 2003 (unchanged from the APG system, of 1998), also recognizes this family and assigns it to the order Caryophyllales in the clade core eudicots.

Recent molecular and biochemical evidence (see the AP-Website) suggests the carnivorous taxa in the order Caryophyllales (the families Droseraceae and Nepenthaceae and the species Drosophyllum lusitanicum and Triphyophyllum peltatum) all belong to the same clade.  This family Ancistrocladaceae would belong to this same clade, although the plants in the family are not carnivorous.

A close relationship between this family and the family Dioncophyllaceae (containing the carnivorous species T. peltatum) is supported by similar pollen and petiole structure.  The Cronquist system, 1981, placed the family in the order Violales (together with Dioncophyllaceae).  The Takhtajan system placed the family in its own order Ancistrocladales.

Description
The only genus in the family Ancistrocladaceae is Ancistrocladus, a little-known genus of about 20 species. These are palaeotropical, climbing, twining plants, found in lowland to submontane, wet to seasonal evergreen or swamp forests. The sparingly branched, sympodial stem is complex and can exceed 10 cm in diameter. It is along one side attached to the tree with grapnels (short, hooked lateral thorns, formed from modified stem apices), opposite to the leaves. Their leaves are borne in dense, evergreen rosettes. They are entire, have short petioles and lack stipules. They have a single wax-secreting trichome in the epidermal pits and glands on the abaxial surface.  The flowers are small with a basally connate corolla, that are imbricate or rolled up lengthwise. The fruit is a nut with often wing-like accrescent sepals.

Distribution
The species of Ancistrocladus are native to tropical Africa, the Indian Subcontinent, and Southeast Asia.

Medicinal potential
Scientific interest in this genus has grown considerably because the canopy liana Ancistrocladus korupensis is considered a potential anti-AIDS source by the National Cancer Institute because of its highly effective mode of action against HIV. This plant was discovered in Cameroon and subsequently recognized as a species new to science. Its ingredient michellamine B, an acetogenic napthyl isoquinoline alkaloid, contained in mature leaves, is the active principle. Also, korupensamine E is a new antimalarial drug extracted from the same plant.

Ancistrocladus abbreviatus has been used on traditional medicine in Ghana, as treatment against measles and fever. The active ingredient is ancistrobrevine D, an alkaloid extracted from this plant.

Ancistrocline, an alkaloid derived from A. tectorius, is used against dysentery.

Many other alkaloids are still being found in the other species.

Species 
Species accepted as of July 2014:

 Ancistrocladus abbreviatus Airy Shaw - western Africa
 Ancistrocladus attenuatus Dyer - West Bengal, Myanmar, Andaman Islands
 Ancistrocladus barteri Scott-Elliot - western Africa
 Ancistrocladus benomensis Rischer & G.Bringmann - Pahang
 Ancistrocladus congolensis J.Léonard  - Congo-Brazzaville, Gabon, Zaïre
 Ancistrocladus ealaensis J.Léonard - Congo-Brazzaville, Gabon, Zaïre, Central African Republic
 Ancistrocladus grandiflorus Cheek - Cameroon
 Ancistrocladus griffithii Planch. - Indochina, Andaman Islands
 Ancistrocladus guineensis Oliv. - Nigeria, Cameroon, Gabon
 Ancistrocladus hamatus (Vahl) Gilg - Sri Lanka
 Ancistrocladus heyneanus Wall. ex J.Graham - southwestern India
 Ancistrocladus ileboensis Heubl, Mudogo & G.Bringmann - Congo-Brazzaville
 Ancistrocladus korupensis D.W.Thomas & Gereau - Nigeria, Cameroon
 Ancistrocladus letestui Pellegr. - Congo-Brazzaville, Gabon, Zaïre, Central African Republic
 Ancistrocladus likoko J.Léonard - Congo-Brazzaville, Zaïre
 Ancistrocladus pachyrrhachis  Warb. - Liberia
 Ancistrocladus robertsoniorum J.Léonard - Kenya
 Ancistrocladus tanzaniensis Cheek & Frim.  - Tanzania
 Ancistrocladus tectorius (Lour.) Merr. - Andaman Islands, Cambodia, Hainan, Borneo, Sumatra, Laos, Malaysia, Myanmar, Singapore, Thailand, Vietnam
 Ancistrocladus uncinatus Hutch. & Dalziel - Nigeria
 Ancistrocladus wallichii Planch. - Assam, Bangladesh, Andaman Islands

References

 anti-AIDS source

Cheek, M. (2000a). A synoptic revision of Ancistrocladus (Ancistrocladaceae) in Africa, with a new species from western Cameroon. Kew Bulletin

External links
 Ancistrocladaceae in L. Watson and M.J. Dallwitz (1992 onwards). The families of flowering plants: descriptions, illustrations, identification, information retrieval. Version: 30 May 2006. http://delta-intkey.com 
 NCBI Taxonomy Browser

Caryophyllales genera
Ancistrocladaceae